Jacquelyn S. (Jacque) Fetrow (born 1960) is a computational biologist, college administrator, and the 15th president of Albright College. Previously, she served as Provost, Vice President of Academic Affairs, and Professor of Chemistry at the University of Richmond, in Richmond, Virginia. Prior to that appointment, she served as Dean of the College at Wake Forest University in Winston-Salem, North Carolina. She also co-founded a company, GeneFormatics, for which she served as Director and Chief Scientific Officer for four years.

Early life and education 
Fetrow is a native of Camp Hill, Pennsylvania. Her mother, Mildred F. Fetrow, was a public school teacher in the West Shore School District, teaching kindergarten, first grade and second grade for many years. Her father, David E. Fetrow, was a carpenter. He also worked as a truck salesman, real estate salesman, and office manager.

Fetrow attended Camp Hill public schools through twelfth grade, Albright College for her bachelor's degree (Biochemistry), and Penn State College of Medicine for a Ph.D. (Biological Chemistry), which she earned in 1986 working with George D. Rose. She did post-doctoral stints at the University of Rochester School of Medicine under the mentorship of Fred Sherman, and at the Whitehead Institute at Massachusetts Institute of Technology under the tutelage of Peter S. Kim.

Career 
Fetrow worked at the University at Albany, SUNY, from 1990 to 1998, serving as assistant and then associate professor of biological sciences.  She then accepted a position at The Scripps Research Institute.  Technology that she helped develop at Scripps served as the foundation for GeneFormatics, Inc., the company that Fetrow co-founded and at which she served as Chief Scientific Officer and Director. In August 2003 she was appointed Reynolds Professor of Computational Biology at Wake Forest University, and in January 2009 she was appointed as Dean of Wake Forest College.  She moved to the University of Richmond to serve as Provost and Vice President of Academic Affairs at the University of Richmond in 2014.  In 2017 she was appointed president of her alma mater, Albright College.

Research 
Fetrow was the first to describe the non-regular protein structure, omega loop, a structure she identified and studied for her doctoral dissertation (work published under the name Jacquelyn F. Leszczynski). Her early research work involved the experimental analysis of these structures in the protein cytochrome c.

Later, Fetrow's work turned to the classification of functional sites in protein structures, resulting in Fuzzy Functional Forms and active site profiling. This work formed the foundation for the company she co-founded, GeneFormatics. Subsequent development of the active site profiling technology was used to create the Peroxiredoxin Classification Index.  This technology has been used to cluster other superfamilies, including the enolases, peroxiredoxins, cytochrome P450s, and arsenate reductases, into functionally relevant clusters.

Awards and honors 
 Alumni Fellow, Pennsylvania State University College of Medicine, 2015
 Distinguished Alumnus/a Award, Albright College, October 2010
 Honorary member, Phi Beta Kappa, Wake Forest University, April 2009
 Teaching Innovation Award (for Bioinformatics course, developed with David John), Center for Teaching and Learning, Wake Forest University, February 2006
 Young Alumnus/a Achievement Award, Albright College, May 1997
 Chancellor's Award for Excellence in Teaching, University at Albany, Spring, 1995 (A SUNY-wide award)
 President's Award for Excellence in Teaching, University at Albany, Spring, 1995
 Member, Jacob Albright Society of Scholars (for high academic achievement), Albright College, May 1982
 NRSA Postdoctoral Fellowship (NIH). January, 1987–January, 1990.

Patents awarded

Selected publications 
Rosen, MR, Leuthaeuser, JB, Parish, CA, & Fetrow, JS (2020). Isofunctional Clustering and Conformational Analysis of the Arsenate Reductase Superfamily Reveals Nine Distinct Clusters. Biochemistry, 59(44), 4262-4284, doi: 10.1021/acs.biochem.0c00651.
Harper AF, Leuthaeuser JB, Babbitt PC, Morris JH, Ferrin TE, Poole LB, Fetrow JS. An Atlas of Peroxiredoxins Created Using an Active Site Profile-Based Approach to Functionally Relevant Clustering of Proteins. PLoS Comput Biol. 2017 Feb 10;13(2):e1005284. doi: 10.1371/journal.pcbi.1005284. eCollection 2017 Feb. PMID: 28187133
Gober JG, Rydeen AE, Gibson-O'Grady EJ, Leuthaeuser JB, Fetrow JS, Brustad EM. Mutating a Highly Conserved Residue in Diverse Cytochrome P450s Facilitates Diastereoselective Olefin Cyclopropanation. Chembiochem. 2016 Mar 2;17(5):394-7. doi: 10.1002/cbic.201500624. Epub 2016 Feb 4. PMID: 26690878. PMCID: 5241096.
Loeser RF, Olex A, McNulty MA, Carlson CS, Callahan M, Ferguson C, Chou J, Leng X, Fetrow JS. Microarray analysis reveals age-related differences in gene expression during the development of osteoarthritis in mice. Arthritis Rheum. 2012 Mar;64(3):705-17. Epub 2011 Oct 3. doi: 10.1002/art.33388. [Epub ahead of print]
Lewis DR, Olex AL, Lundy SR, Turkett WH, Fetrow JS, Muday GK. A kinetic analysis of the auxin transcriptome reveals cell wall remodeling proteins that modulate lateral root development in Arabidopsis. Plant Cell. 2013 Sep;25(9):3329-46. doi: 10.1105/tpc.113.114868. Epub 2013 Sep 17.
Nelson KJ, Knutson ST, Soito L, Klomsiri C, Poole LB, Fetrow JS. Analysis of the peroxiredoxin family: using active-site structure and sequence information for global classification and residue analysis. Proteins. 2011 Mar;79(3):947-64. doi: 10.1002/prot.22936. Epub 2010 Dec 22.
Salsbury Jr., F.R., Knutson, S.T., Poole, LB, and Fetrow, J.S. Functional Site Profiling and Electrostatic Analysis of Cysteines Modifiable to Cysteine Sulfenic Acid. Protein Sci. 2008 Feb;17(2):299-312.
Skolnick, J. and Fetrow, J.S. From genes to structure:  novel applications of computational approaches in the genomic era. Trends in Biotech. 2000 Jan;18(1):34-39.
Skolnick, J., Fetrow, J.S., Kolinski, A.  Structural genomics and its importance for gene function analysis.  Nature Biotechnology. 2000 Mar;18(3):283-287.
Fetrow, J.S. and Skolnick, J. Method for prediction of protein function from sequence using the sequence-to-structure-to-function paradigm with application to glutaredoxins/thioredoxins and T1 ribonucleases.  J. Mol. Biol. 1998 Sep 4;281(5):949-968. 
Fetrow, J.S. and Godzik, A. Function driven protein evolution: A possible proto-protein for the RNA-binding proteins.  Proceedings of Pacific Symposium on Biocomputing (Ed. R.B. Altman, A.K. Dunker, L. Hunter T. Klein). 1998 485-496.
Fetrow, J.S.  Omega Loops:  Nonregular secondary structures significant in protein function and stability. FASEB J. 1995 Jun;9(9):708-717.
Leszczynski (Fetrow), J.F. and Rose, G.D.  Loops in globular proteins:  Identification of a novel category of secondary structure.  Science. 1986 Nov 14;234(4778):849-55.

References 

1960 births
Living people
People from Camp Hill, Pennsylvania
Albright College faculty
Albright College alumni
American academic administrators
American women biochemists
American women academics
21st-century American women